Iváncsa Községi Sportegyesület is a professional football club based in Iváncsa, Fejér County, Hungary, that competes in the Nemzeti Bajnokság III, the third tier of Hungarian football.

History
Iváncsa is going to compete in the 2017–18 Nemzeti Bajnokság III.

On October 19 2022. Iváncsa pulled off the greatest result in their history, as they upset the reigning champions and cup holders, Ferencváros, winning 3–2 after extra time in the last 32 of the 2022–23 Hungarian Cup.

Honours

External links
 Profile on Magyar Futball

References

Football clubs in Hungary
Association football clubs established in 1920
1920 establishments in Hungary